Roughshod may refer to:

Roughshod (1922 film), an American western film directed by B. Reeves Eason
Roughshod (1949 film), an American western film directed by Mark Robson
Roughshod, a 1951 novel by Norman A. Fox, later filmed as Gunsmoke (1953)
"Roughshod" , a 1959 song by Link Wray

See also
 Brutality (disambiguation)